Oriano Giovanelli (born 24 December 1957) is an Italian politician who served as Mayor of Pesaro (1992–2004) and Deputy for two legislatures (2006–2008, 2008–2013).

References

1957 births
Italian Communist Party politicians
Democratic Party of the Left politicians
Democrats of the Left politicians
Democratic Party (Italy) politicians
Deputies of Legislature XV of Italy
Deputies of Legislature XVI of Italy
Mayors of Pesaro
People from Urbino
Living people